Six ships and one depot of the Royal Navy have borne the name HMS Columbine, after the common name for the plant Aquilegia. A seventh ship was planned, but renamed before being launched:

HMS Columbine was to have been a 22-gun sixth rate, but she was renamed  in 1805 and launched in 1806.
 was an 18-gun  launched in 1806 and wrecked in 1824.
 was an 18-gun sloop launched in 1826. She was converted to a 12-gun brig in 1849, a coal hulk in 1854, and was sold in 1892.
 was a wooden screw sloop launched in 1862 and broken up in 1875.
 was a tender purchased in 1897 and sold in 1907.
HMS Columbine was a naval base at Port Edgar on the Firth of Forth between 1917 and 1938.
 was a  launched in 1940. She was sold in 1946 as the civilian vessel Lief Welding, and was broken up in 1966.

Royal Navy ship names